The boreal top or boreal top snail (Zoogenetes harpa) is  species of minute, air-breathing land snails, terrestrial pulmonate gastropod molluscs in the family Valloniidae, and the sole species in the genus Zoogenetes.

Z. harpa occurs in the northern United States, across Canada, as well as in Scandinavia, the Swiss Alps, Russia, and Japan.

Description, habitat, and status

The boreal top snail is species of minute, air-breathing land snails, terrestrial pulmonate gastropod molluscs in the family Valloniidae. It is the sole species in the genus Zoogenetes.

Its cone-shaped shell is reddish-brown, with ridges along the bottom spirals. Z. harpa is most active during fall and spring, when temperatures are more mild and moisture levels are higher. It lives on the bottom of logs and debris, often near or at the bottom of canyons with predominantly fir forests.

The snail is not considered generally endangered, though populations in some locations are considered threatened to varying degrees.

Distribution
Z. harpa occurs in the northern United States and across Canada, and was discovered in the Uinta Mountains in northeastern Utah in April 2021, where it is now considered "likely native". It is also found in Scandinavia, Russia, the Swiss Alps, and Japan.

Predators
Predators of Z. harpa include small mammals, insects, and birds such as wild turkeys and grouse.

References 

Valloniidae